Malaita Kingz FC is a Solomon Islands football club based in Honiara, which plays in the Telekom S-League.

Achievements 
 2011–12 Telekom S-League Premiership - Fifth Place

Current squad
Squad for the 2018-19 S-League

Football clubs in the Solomon Islands
Honiara